Aleksandra Kaleta (born 5 March 1998) is a Polish judoka who competes at international judo competitions. She is a World Junior bronze medalist and has won a bronze medal at the 2021 Judo Grand Slam in Antalya, Turkey.

References

External links
 

1998 births
Living people
Polish female judoka
Place of birth missing (living people)
21st-century Polish women